Eileen Seigh (born December 27, 1928) is a retired American figure skater. She represented the United States at the 1948 Winter Olympics, where she placed 11th. Following her retirement from competitive skating, she skated professionally on Broadway in the Howdy, Mr. Ice ice show. She later worked as a skating coach at the Broadmoor Hotel in Colorado Springs, Colorado. In December 1952 she married one of her pupils, Pete Honnen, the founder of the heavy equipment company Honnen Equipment.

Competitive highlights

References

External links
 
 

American female single skaters
Olympic figure skaters of the United States
Figure skaters at the 1948 Winter Olympics
1928 births
Sportspeople from New York City
Living people
21st-century American women
20th-century American women